Kanittha Tissa was King of Anuradhapura in the 2nd century, whose reign lasted from 165 to 193. He succeeded his brother Bhatika Tissa as King of Anuradhapura and was succeeded by his son Cula Naga. 

It is said that Kanittha Tissa established a monastery called Ratna Prasadaya in the Abhayagiri Vihara and built pirivenas in the vicinity of temples scattered throughout the kingdom.

However, despite the efforts he made to uplift Buddhism, no special contribution was given to the agricultural sector of the country.

See also
 List of Sri Lankan monarchs
 History of Sri Lanka

References

External links
 Kings & Rulers of Sri Lanka
 Codrington's Short History of Ceylon

K
K
Sinhalese Buddhist monarchs
K
K